A lamplighter was an employee of a town who lit street lights.

Lamplighter may also refer to:

Arts
 Lamplighters Music Theatre, a San Francisco-based light opera company
 The Lamplighter, a 2007 radio play by Jackie Kay

Literature
 The Lamplighter, an 1854 novel by Maria Susanna Cummins
 "The Lamplighter" (poem), a poem by Robert Louis Stevenson
 Monster Blood Tattoo: Lamplighter, a 2006 novel by D. M. Cornish
 The Lamplighter, a 1929 collection of poems by Irish poet Seamus O'Sullivan
 "Lamplighter", a 1987 children's story by Bernice Thurman Hunter
 Lamplighter, a Green Lantern enemy in DC comics
 Lamplighters, a group of characters in John Le Carré's novel Tinker Tailor Soldier Spy (1974)

People with the surname
 L. Jagi Lamplighter, an American fantasy writer

Other uses
 Lamplighter (horse)
 Tall bike, an unusually tall bicycle, also known as a lamplighter

See also
 Lamplighters Yeshivah, a Jewish Montessori-style school in Brooklyn, US
 Lamplighter group, a mathematical object
 "The Old Lamp-Lighter", a song by The Browns